Latoya Joyner (born September 13, 1986) is the Assembly member for the 77th District of the New York State Assembly. She is a Democrat. The district includes portions of Claremont, Concourse, Highbridge, Mount Eden and Morris Heights in The Bronx.

Life and career
Joyner was born and raised in the Bronx and graduated from the Richard R. Green High School for Teaching. She later attended SUNY Stony Brook for her undergraduate degree and later the University at Buffalo for law school. At Stony Brook, Joyner was a member of Chi Alpha Epsilon Honor Society and Phi Beta Kappa.

Previously, she served as a member of the New York State Bar and with the New York City Criminal Court. She was a community liaison in the district office of former Assemblywoman Aurelia Greene, and later was a member of Bronx Community Board 4.

New York Assembly
Assemblywoman Vanessa Gibson resigned from her seat after being elected to the New York City Council in 2013, and following her resignation, the seat remained vacant for a year. Joyner entered the race to succeed her, and in a four-way primary, easily won the election. She would win the general election with nearly 95% of the vote.

Joyner was sworn in for her first term on January 1, 2015.  Currently, she serves on the Subcommittee on Diversity in Law as its Chairwoman.

References

External links
New York State Assemblywoman Latoya Joyner official site

Living people
Democratic Party members of the New York State Assembly
Politicians from the Bronx
21st-century American politicians
21st-century American women politicians
Women state legislators in New York (state)
1986 births
Stony Brook University alumni
University at Buffalo Law School alumni